Joy Garratt (born April 11, 1952) is an American politician and educator serving as a member of the New Mexico House of Representatives from the 29th district, which includes portions of Bernalillo County.

Early life and education 
Garratt was born in Long Beach, California. She earned a Bachelor of Science degree in communication and history from Excelsior University in Albany, New York and a Master of Arts in educational leadership from the University of New Mexico.

Career 
After earning her master's degree, Garratt worked as a social studies teacher in Albuquerque, New Mexico and Pasadena, California. Garratt also worked abroad as an English teacher in South Korea. Garratt defeated incumbent Republican David Adkins in the November 2018 general election for the 29th district of the New Mexico House of Representatives, and assumed office on January 15, 2019.

References 

Democratic Party members of the New Mexico House of Representatives
1952 births
People from Long Beach, California
Excelsior College alumni
University of New Mexico alumni
Living people